The 1927–28 Montreal Maroons season was the 4th season for the National Hockey League franchise.

Offseason

Regular season

Final standings

Record vs. opponents

Game log

Playoffs
The Maroons made it into the playoffs.  They defeated Ottawa in the first round 3 goals to 1 or 3–1.  They went against the Canadiens in the second round and won 3 goals to 2, or 3–2.  The 2nd game was a reversal of fortune from previous year against Montreal Canadiens, when Howie Morenz eliminated them with an overtime goal.  This year it was Maroons Russell Oatman who provided the margin of victory, at 8:10 of overtime, to upset the 1st place Canadiens.  They went against the Rangers in the finals in a best of five and lost in 5 games, or 3–2.  All games were played at the Montreal Forum with New York's Madison Square Gardens unavailable due a circus.  Forty-four-year-old Rangers coach/manager Lester Patrick replaced the injured Lorne Chabot in game 2 and backstopped New York to 2–1 overtime victory.  After Maroons won game 3, 2–0, with Clint Benedict recording his NHL record 15th and final shutout, Rangers came back to win games 4 and 5 and secure the Stanley Cup.  Goaltender Joe Miller was loaned to New York by New York Americans for the final 3 games of the series as an injury replacement.

Player stats

Note: Pos = Position; GP = Games played; G = Goals; A = Assists; Pts = Points; PIM = Penalty minutes      MIN = Minutes played; W = Wins; L = Losses; T = Ties; GA = Goals-against; GAA = Goals-against average; SO = Shutouts;

Awards and records

Transactions

See also
1927–28 NHL season

References

External links

Montreal
Montreal
Montreal Maroons seasons